Alan Wilber Rittinger (January 28, 1925 – December 10, 2017) was a Canadian ice hockey player who played 19 games in the National Hockey League with Boston Bruins during the 1943–44 season. The rest of his career, which lasted from 1943 to 1952, was spent in different minor leagues.

Career statistics

Regular season and playoffs

References

External links

1925 births
2017 deaths
Boston Bruins players
Boston Olympics players
Canadian ice hockey right wingers
Fort Worth Rangers players
New Haven Eagles players
Seattle Ironmen players
Oakland Oaks (PCHL) players
Sportspeople from Regina, Saskatchewan
Vancouver Canucks (WHL) players